Lorberbaum is a surname. Notable people with the surname include:

Jeffrey Lorberbaum (born 1954), American billionaire businessman
Menachem Lorberbaum (born 1958), Israeli academic
Yaakov Lorberbaum (1760–1832), Polish rabbi and posek